Orazio Egidio Santelli was an Italian fencer. He competed in the individual masters sabre event at the 1900 Summer Olympics.

References

External links
 

Year of birth missing
Year of death missing
Italian male fencers
Olympic fencers of Italy
Fencers at the 1900 Summer Olympics
Place of birth missing
Place of death missing